Boccia at the 2008 Summer Paralympics consisted of seven events. The competitions were held in the Beijing National Convention Center from September 7 to September 12.

Classification
Boccia players were given a classification depending on the type and extent of their disability. The classification system allows players to compete against others with a similar level of function. The boccia classifications were BC1 through BC4.

Events
For each of the events below, medals were contested for one or more of the above classifications. All events were mixed, meaning that men and women competed together.

Mixed singles
 BC1
 BC2
 BC3
 BC4
Mixed team
 BC1–2
Mixed pairs
 BC3
 BC4

Participating countries
There were 88 athletes taking part in this sport.

Medal summary

Medal table

This ranking sorts countries by the number of gold medals earned by their players (in this context a country is an entity represented by a National Paralympic Committee). The number of silver medals is taken into consideration next and then the number of bronze medals. If, after the above, countries are still tied, equal ranking is given and they are listed alphabetically.

Medalists

References

External links
Official site of the 2008 Summer Paralympics
IPC
CPISRA

 
2008
2008 Summer Paralympics events
2008 in bowls